Carrigans is a townland in County Tyrone, Northern Ireland. It is situated in the historic barony of Strabane Upper and the civil parish of Cappagh and covers an area of 859 acres.

The name derives from the Irish: Carraigínidhe (small rocks).

The population of the townland declined during the 19th century:

The townland contains one Scheduled Historic Monument: a Court tomb (grid ref: H4218 8076).

See also
List of townlands of County Tyrone
List of archaeological sites in County Tyrone

References

External links

Townlands of County Tyrone
Archaeological sites in County Tyrone
Barony of Strabane Upper